Ty Glas railway station is a railway station serving business and industrial sites in Llanishen and Heath, Cardiff, Wales.

The Coryton branch Line is a single-track, though unlike other stations on the branch, Ty Glas has entrances at both the north and south of the station; access from the south requires passengers to cross the track to reach the platform sited on the north side of the track.

Passenger services are provided by Transport for Wales as part of the Valley Lines network.

Services
Monday to Saturday daytimes, there is a half-hourly service southbound to Cardiff Central and onwards to Radyr on the City Line and to Coryton northbound. Evenings there is an hourly service in each direction but there is no Sunday service.

See also
List of railway stations in Cardiff

References

External links

Llanishen, Cardiff
Railway stations in Cardiff
DfT Category F2 stations
Railway stations opened by British Rail
Railway stations in Great Britain opened in 1987
Railway stations served by Transport for Wales Rail